The 1997 Georgia Southern Eagles football team represented Georgia Southern University as a member of the Southern Conference (SoCon) during the 1997 NCAA Division I-AA football season. Led by first-year head coach Paul Johnson, the Eagles compiled an overall record of 10–3 with a mark of 7–1  in conference play, winning the SoCon title. Georgia Southern advanced to the NCAA Division I-AA Football Championship playoffs, where they beat  in the first round before losing to Delaware in the quarterfinals. The Eagles played their home games at Paulson Stadium in Statesboro, Georgia.

Schedule

References

Georgia Southern
Georgia Southern Eagles football seasons
Southern Conference football champion seasons
Georgia Southern Eagles football